Shane Roberts (born 18 July 1998) is a South African soccer player who plays as a midfielder for Royal AM.

Career

Cape Town City
A product of the club's youth academy, Roberts made his league debut for the club on 17 February 2018, coming on as a 59th minute substitute for Teko Modise in a 1-0 defeat to the Kaizer Chiefs.

References

External links
Shane Roberts at Sofa Score

1998 births
Living people
Sportspeople from Cape Town
South African soccer players
Association football midfielders
Cape Town City F.C. (2016) players
TS Galaxy F.C. players
Royal AM F.C. players
South African Premier Division players